Gravity is the fourth album by Out of the Grey, released on August 1, 1995. It saw the second album that brought the band into an Adult Contemporary vein, which appealed to contemporary Christian music radio formats with several singles.

Track listing 
All songs written by Christine and Scott Denté, except where noted.

"Stay Close" – 3:46
"When Love Comes to Life" (Christine Denté, Scott Denté, Charlie Peacock) – 4:12
"Hope in Sight" (Christine Denté, Scott Denté, Charlie Peacock) – 3:56
"So We Never Got to Paris" – 3:59
"The Weight of the Words" (Christine Denté, Scott Denté, Charlie Peacock) – 4:20
"Gravity" – 4:10
"Pretending" – 3:03
"I Can Wait" (Christine Denté) – 3:30
"Bird on a Wire" – 4:25
"Dreaming of April" (Christine Denté) – 3:43
source:

Personnel 
 Christine Denté – lead and backing vocals 
 Scott Denté – lead and backing vocals, acoustic guitar, electric guitars (6)
 Gordon Kennedy – electric guitars (1-5, 7-10)
 Jerry McPherson – electric guitars (6)
 Tim Lauer – keyboards (1, 4), accordion (4), harmonium (4)
 Blair Masters – keyboards (1, 2, 5)
 Charlie Peacock – keyboards (2, 4, 5, 6, 8)
 Pat Coil – keyboards (7, 9, 10)
 Jimmie Lee Sloas – bass (1, 2, 3, 5, 8)
 Paul Socolow – bass (4, 6, 7, 9, 10)
 Todd Turkisher – drums (1, 3, 4, 6-10)
 Steve Brewster – drums (2, 5)
 Eric Darken – tambourine (1), percussion (2, 4, 5)
 Rick Stone – tambourine (3)
 Samba – chimes (8)
 Molly Felder – backing vocals (1)
 Nicol Smith – backing vocals (2)

Production 
 Charlie Peacock – producer 
 Peter York – executive producer 
 Elliot Scheiner – tracking engineer (1, 3, 4, 6-10), mixing (1, 2, 4, 5)
 Shane D. Wilson – overdub engineer, tracking engineer (2, 5), mix assistant (7, 8, 10)
 Rick Will – mixing (3, 6, 9)
 Tom Laune – mixing (7, 8, 10)
 Glen Marchese – mix assistant (1, 2, 4, 5)
 Pete Martinez – mix assistant (3, 6, 9)
 Ken Love – mastering 
 Andi Ashworth – budget administration 
 Jeff Pitzer – additional assistance 
 Richard Rose – additional assistance 
 Karen Philpott – art direction, design 
 Andrew Eccles – photography 
 Kyni Cantor – stylist 
 Helena Ochipinti – hair, make-up 
 Proper Management – management 

Studios
 Recorded at CP Productions (Nashville, Tennessee).
 Mixed at The Hit Factory (New York City, New York); Sixteenth Avenue Sound and Battery Studios (Nashville, Tennessee).
 Mastered at MasterMix (Nashville, Tennessee).

References 

Out of the Grey albums
1995 albums
Sparrow Records albums